The 1997 Canadian Open (also known as the du Maurier Open for sponsorship reasons) was a tennis tournament played on outdoor hard courts. It was the 108th edition of the Canada Masters and was part of the ATP Super 9 of the 1997 ATP Tour and of Tier I of the 1997 WTA Tour. The men's event took place at the du Maurier Stadium in Montreal, Quebec, Canada from July 28 through August 4, 1997, while the women's event took place at the National Tennis Centre in Toronto, Ontario, Canada from August 11 through August 17, 1997. Chris Woodruff and Monica Seles won the singles titles. It was Seles' first Tier I title of the year and her seventh overall. It was her third consecutive title at the event after winning in 1995 and 1996.

Finals

Men's singles

 Chris Woodruff defeated  Gustavo Kuerten 7–5, 4–6, 6–3
 It was Woodruff's only title of the year and the 1st of his career.

Women's singles

 Monica Seles defeated  Anke Huber 6–2, 6–4
 It was Seles' 2nd title of the year and the 44th of her career.

Men's doubles

 Mahesh Bhupathi /  Leander Paes defeated  Sébastien Lareau /  Alex O'Brien 7–6, 6–3
 It was Bhupathi's 3rd title of the year and the 3rd of his career. It was Paes' 3rd title of the year and the 3rd of his career.

Women's doubles

 Yayuk Basuki /  Caroline Vis defeated  Nicole Arendt /  Manon Bollegraf 3–6, 7–5, 6–4
 It was Basuki's 2nd title of the year and the 13th of her career. It was Vis' 2nd title of the year and the 4th of her career.

References

External links
 
 Association of Tennis Professionals (ATP) tournament profile
 Women's Tennis Association (WTA) tournament profile

 
Du Maurier Open
Du Maurier Open
Canadian Open (tennis)
1997 in Canadian tennis